Uptoi Indian village is located in Columbus, Georgia.

"Uptoi" or "Utoy" means "boundary" in the Muscogian Creek Language.

An early Indian village of the Creek Muscogian Indians was established in the 15th century.

Peaceful farmers traded with local colonists. Their lands were guaranteed under a treaty with the United States Senate. Their lands were forcibly ceded at Indian Springs, Georgia by the US Army influenced by the State of Georgia who wanted more free land to give to immigrants.

In 1821 they were forcibly moved to the current state of Oklahoma by the US Army as ordered by President Andrew Jackson.

Today the lands are occupied by the US Army at Fort Benning, Georgia.

Neighborhoods in Columbus, Georgia